Greentown is an unincorporated community in eastern Smithfield Township, Jefferson County, Ohio, United States. Part of the Dry Fork of Short Creek, a stream that meets the Ohio River at Rayland, flows past the community. The community is part of the Weirton–Steubenville, WV-OH Metropolitan Statistical Area.

Education
Public education in the community of Greentown is provided by the Buckeye Local School District.

References

Unincorporated communities in Jefferson County, Ohio
Unincorporated communities in Ohio